Massachusetts House of Representatives' 14th Middlesex district in the United States is one of 160 legislative districts included in the lower house of the Massachusetts General Court. It covers part of Middlesex County. Democrat Tami Gouveia of Acton has represented the district since 2019.

Towns represented
The district includes the following localities:
 part of Acton
 Carlisle
 part of Chelmsford
 Concord

The current district geographic boundary overlaps with those of the Massachusetts Senate's 3rd Middlesex district and Middlesex and Worcester district.

Former locales
The district previously covered:
 Holliston, circa 1872 
 Sherborn, circa 1872

Representatives
 Josiah H. Temple, circa 1858 
 James W. Brown, circa 1859 
 Montressor Tyler Allen, circa 1888 
 Horace G. Wadlin, circa 1888 
 Owen E. Brennen, circa 1920 
 Charles Henry Slowey, circa 1920 
 Cornelius F. Kiernan, circa 1951 
 Raymond Joseph Lord, circa 1951 
 Donald J. Manning, circa 1975 
 John H. Loring
 Pam Resor
 Cory Atkins
 Tami L. Gouveia, 2019-current

See also
 List of Massachusetts House of Representatives elections
 List of Massachusetts General Courts
 List of former districts of the Massachusetts House of Representatives
 Other Middlesex County districts of the Massachusetts House of Representatives: 1st, 2nd, 3rd, 4th, 5th, 6th, 7th, 8th, 9th, 10th, 11th, 12th, 13th, 15th, 16th, 17th, 18th, 19th, 20th, 21st, 22nd, 23rd, 24th, 25th, 26th, 27th, 28th, 29th, 30th, 31st, 32nd, 33rd, 34th, 35th, 36th, 37th

Images
Portraits of legislators

References

External links
 Ballotpedia
  (State House district information based on U.S. Census Bureau's American Community Survey).
 League of Women Voters—Acton Area
 League of Women Voters of Concord-Carlisle
 League of Women Voters of Chelmsford

House
Government of Middlesex County, Massachusetts